Springtown is a town in Benton County, Arkansas, United States. The population was 87 at the 2010 census. It is part of the Northwest Arkansas region.

History
The first settlement at Springtown was made in the 1840s. The town was platted in 1871. A post office called Springtown was established in 1871, and remained in operation until 1998. The community was named for a spring near the original town site.

Geography

Springtown is located in southwest Benton County at  (36.260908, -94.422370), between Highfill and Gentry.

Demographics

As of the census of 2000, there were 114 people, 41 households, and 30 families residing in the town. The population density was 81.5/km (212.6/mi2). There were 47 housing units at an average density of 33.6/km (87.7/mi2). The racial makeup of the town was 85.09% White, 6.14% Native American, 0.88% Asian, 3.51% from other races, and 4.39% from two or more races. 8.77% of the population were Hispanic or Latino of any race.

There were 41 households, out of which 36.6% had children under the age of 18 living with them, 58.5% were married couples living together, 14.6% had a female householder with no husband present, and 24.4% were non-families. 24.4% of all households were made up of individuals, and 7.3% had someone living alone who was 65 years of age or older. The average household size was 2.78 and the average family size was 3.26.

In the town, the population was spread out, with 28.1% under the age of 18, 15.8% from 18 to 24, 29.8% from 25 to 44, 19.3% from 45 to 64, and 7.0% who were 65 years of age or older. The median age was 31 years. For every 100 females, there were 93.2 males. For every 100 females age 18 and over, there were 95.2 males.

The median income for a household in the town was $26,250, and the median income for a family was $38,750. Males had a median income of $25,750 versus $21,250 for females. The per capita income for the town was $12,497. There were 13.0% of families and 10.2% of the population living below the poverty line, including no under eighteens and none of those over 64.

Education 
Public education for elementary and secondary students is primarily provided by the Gentry School District, which leads to graduation from Gentry High School.

References

Towns in Benton County, Arkansas
Towns in Arkansas
Northwest Arkansas
1871 establishments in Arkansas